is a leading case on the English law of trusts, concerning tracing and the availability of proprietary relief following a breach of trust.

Facts
In breach of trust, Mr Murphy took £20,440 from a company he controlled. Over 200 investors (including one Mr Foskett) had invested in the company for the purpose of buying land in the Algarve, Portugal. The land had been bought, but not developed as promised.

Mr Murphy used the trust money to pay off the fourth and fifth instalments on his life insurance policy. He had already paid the first two or three premiums with his own money.

Mr Murphy committed suicide. His children (the Defendants) were paid the £1,000,000 under the insurance policy. Mr Foskett and the other investors (the Claimants) sued the Defendants, claiming a 40% share in the policy monies.

The Claimants argued they had a proprietary interest in the insurance monies: the insurance policy had been purchased using a proportion of misapplied trust funds. The Defendants argued that only an equitable lien was available, and the beneficiaries should only receive the amount taken.

Judgments

Court of Appeal

The Court of Appeal held the Claimants could only get an equitable lien over the proceeds of the policy to secure the repayment of the fourth and fifth premiums. Sir Richard Scott VC suggested a beneficiary should get a share of the property’s total value that was created by any expenditure deriving from trust property money. Hobhouse LJ gave a concurring judgment and Morritt LJ dissented.

House of Lords

The House of Lords held (Lord Steyn and Lord Hope dissenting) that the beneficiaries could claim a proprietary right over the insurance policy proceeds and J would get 35 and L would get 5%.

Lord Browne-Wilkinson 

Lord Browne-Wilkinson gave the first speech, concurring with Lord Hoffmann and Lord Millett, suggesting the beneficiary can have a charge against property that was improved by paying the worker with trust money, unlike Re Diplock, whether or not expenditure increased the property value.

Lord Millett 

Lord Millett, giving the leading judgment, held that this was a case concerning the vindication of property rights, not of unjust enrichment. The claimants could elect between (proportionate) beneficial ownership or an equitable lien, whichever was the most advantageous. One traces inherent value, and one set of tracing rules suffices. Just as if the trustee had taken money, bought a lottery ticket and won, it would be fair to take away the winnings without a change of position defence. Tracing is distinct from following, which is just locating the asset itself. He appeared to reject possibility of a change of position defence, because tracing claims were not based on unjust enrichment, rather on the simple vindication of property rights. He continued,

Lord Millett added that claimant may elect whether to have a proportional share of the beneficial interest, or an equitable lien.

Lord Hoffmann 
Lord Hoffmann gave a short speech concurring with Lord Millett.

Lord Hope 
Lord Hope gave a dissenting judgment, and would have held that only an amount to cover the premiums plus interest should have been available.

Lord Hope added that a claim formulated in terms of unjust enrichment would not be appropriate because the defendants were "innocent third parties to the unjust transactions between the life assured and the purchasers." It followed there was no causal link.

Lord Steyn 
Lord Steyn gave a dissenting judgment, and would have held that only a lien was available.

See also

English law of trusts
English law of unjust enrichment 
English law of restitution
Rei vindicatio

Notes

References
A Burrows, ‘Proprietary restitution: unmasking unjust enrichment’ (2001) 117 LQR 412
Lord Millett, ‘Proprietary Restitution’ in Degeling and Edelman (ed) Equity in Commercial Law (Thompson 2005) 324
G Virgo, The Principles of the Law of Restitution (2006) 569-580
S Williston, 'The Right to Follow Trust Property when Confused with other Property' (1888) 2 Harvard Law Review 28,

English trusts case law
English unjust enrichment case law
House of Lords cases
2000 in case law
2000 in British law